Uniformization may refer to:
 Uniformization (set theory), a mathematical concept in set theory
 Uniformization theorem, a mathematical result in complex analysis and differential geometry 
 Uniformization (probability theory), a method to find a discrete-time Markov chain analogous to a continuous-time Markov chain
 Uniformizable space, a topological space whose topology is induced by some uniform structure